El papelerito is a 1951 Mexican film. It stars Sara García, Domingo Soler and Angel Calpi.

Plot

In the suburbs of Mexico City, a very poor but loving family depends on the work of all of the members. Doña Dominga, the matriarch, works in a small food stand which is very successful. Don Simón, the patriarch, is a shoeshine. The rest of the family consists of three rooted children, Toñito, Pirrín and Gloria are very happy despite their poverty and Gloria's handicapped condition. As they make their way along the city, they encounter policemen and are very much into the whole rogue lifestyle. Toñito's mom, Elvira, is a convict in the women's prison who has no interest in forging a relationship with her son. Doña Dominga hates this and tries to make Toñito feel loved. After Elvira escapes prison she encounters her criminal boyfriend, Paco who is planning a hit but is discovered by the police. Toñito is around when this happens, and wants to be with Elvira. Elvira's feelings as a woman however, are stronger than those of motherhood and she chases Paco who is trying to elude the police. Adamant about avoiding capture, he starts shooting the policemen who in turn, shoot and kill him. Unfortunately they also shoot Toñito in the crossfire. Elvira, seemingly more dismayed for Paco than for Toñito is captured and sent back to jail. Eventually she feels remorseful about her attitude and visits Toñito in the hospital. He is sent home with his adoptive family. Doña Dominga seeks an apparatus to help him recover, but unfortunately while she is away Toñito dies. Elvira is told and she tearfully exclaims she is guilty for her son's death. Doña Dominga, Don Simón, Gloria and Pirrín try to continue their life as they think about ways to become more prosperous.

External links
 

1951 films
1950s Spanish-language films
Mexican black-and-white films
Mexican comedy-drama films
1951 comedy-drama films
1950s Mexican films